Elite Residence is a supertall skyscraper in Dubai, United Arab Emirates in the Dubai Marina district, overlooking one of the man-made palm islands, Palm Jumeirah.

Of the 91 floors, 76 are for 695 apartments and the other 15 include amenities such as car-parking, swimming pools, spas, reception areas, health clubs, a business centre and a gymnasium.

The skyscraper has 695 apartments and 12 elevators.

The tower was the third-tallest residential building in the world when completed on 21 January 2012. As of 2022, it is the eighth-tallest residential building in the world.

See also
List of tallest buildings in Dubai
List of tallest buildings in the United Arab Emirates

References

External links 
 Developer website
 Community website

Residential skyscrapers in Dubai
2012 establishments in the United Arab Emirates
High-tech architecture
Postmodern architecture